Diamonds & Daggerz is a 2004 remix album by industrial music group My Life with the Thrill Kill Kult. It contains both new and classic songs extensively reworked and remixed into one continuous mix. Several of the tracks are mash-up remixes of multiple songs.

Track listing

Personnel
Engineer [Engineered by] – Skye d'Angelo
Featuring [Directed by] – Groovie Mann
Featuring [Starring] – Avaluciuos Whyte, Groovie Mann, Jacky Blacque, Jasmine Night, Kitty Killdare, Lois Blue, Lydia Lunch, Marcie, Rhonda Bond, Sekret DeZyre, Shawn Christopher, Sinderella Pussie, Viva Nova
Mastered by – Collin Jordan
Mixed by – Enzo X. Santiago
Producer [Produced by] – Buzz McCoy
Written by – Buzz McCoy

Samples
The back cover of the album reads "* this album contains previously released Thrill Kill Kult samples". The following is a list of the samples:
"Mz Disco" samples "Mindcage".
"Out 4 the Kill" samples "A Continental Touch".
"Mondo Fever" samples "Golden Strip", "Portrait of the Damned", and "The International Sin Set".
"Flesh Star" samples "Disko Fleshpot" and "Starmartyr".
"Young Tongue" samples "A Girl Doesn't Get Killed by a Make-Believe Lover... 'Cuz It's Hot", "Disko Fleshpot", "Flesh Playhouse", and "Kooler Than Jesus".
"Evil Lover" samples "...And This Is What the Devil Does!", "Mystery Babylon", "Sexy Sucker", and "Universal Blackness".
"Dope Kult" samples "...And This Is What the Devil Does!", "A Daisy Chain 4 Satan", "After the Flesh", "Easy Girl", "Ride the Mindway", and "The Days of Swine and Roses".

References

External links

2004 remix albums
My Life with the Thrill Kill Kult albums
Industrial remix albums